Liuskasaari is an island located south of Helsinki, Finland. This island is home of the Helsingfors Segelsällskap, one of the oldest sailing clubs in Finland. The island hosts two restaurants: The HSS Clubhouse Restaurant and the Skiffer outdoor restaurant. This island has about 50 000 visitors annually and can be reached by a ferry that traffics the island from the Merisatama park.

The island hosted some of the sailing events for the 1952 Summer Olympics.

References
 1952 Summer Olympics official report. p. 58.
 City of Helsinki Sports Department on Liuskasaari.

External links
 

Venues of the 1952 Summer Olympics
Olympic sailing venues
Sports venues in Finland
Ullanlinna
Islands of Uusimaa